Crush.Fukk.Create: Requiem for Generation Armageddon is the second video album by Polish extreme metal band Behemoth.

Track listing

Disc 1

Disc 2

Personnel 

Adam "Nergal" Darski – lead vocals, rhythm guitar, production
Mateusz "Havoc" Śmierzchalski – lead guitar, backing vocals
Marcin "Novy" Nowak – bass, backing vocals (Live at Mystic Festival 2001)
Tomasz "Orion" Wróblewski – bass, backing vocals (Live at Party San Festival 2003), production
Zbigniew "Inferno" Promiński – drums
Tomasz "Graal" Daniłowicz – cover art

Łukasz Dunaj – band biography
Arkadiusz "Malta" Malczewski – sound engineering
Alfred Sosgórnik – production
Rafał "Brovar" Brauer – technician
Melissa – translations

Release history

References 

Behemoth (band) video albums
Live video albums
2004 video albums
2004 live albums
Regain Records live albums
Regain Records video albums
Albums produced by Adam Darski